The Sky Is Too High is the first solo album by Blur guitarist Graham Coxon. Released in 1998, he wrote, recorded and produced all the music himself. Most of the album consists of lo-fi acoustic songs with some overdubbed electric guitar and percussion, similar in style to the Blur songs "Miss America" (from Modern Life is Rubbish) and "You're So Great" (from Blur, one of the few Blur songs with Coxon singing lead vocals).

Track listing

On the album cover, another song titled "(pause)" is listed in the track list between "Who the Fuck?" and "Mornin' Blues" but it has been crossed out, making it unreadable. There are however only 11 songs on the album and there is no track between "Who the Fuck?" and "Mornin' Blues".

1998 debut albums
Graham Coxon albums